Ken Mudford (17 April 1923 – 17 May 2004) was a New Zealand professional Grand Prix motorcycle road racer. He competed in the FIM motorcycle Grand Prix world championships from 1951 to 1953 and was a member of the New Zealand team that competed in the Isle of Man tourist trophy races. Mudford is notable for winning the 350 class at the 1953 Ulster Grand Prix when the Norton factory racing team asked him to replace the injured Ray Amm. Mudford rode to victory ahead of AJS riders Bob McIntyre and Rod Coleman. In 1952 he was 8th in the Isle of Man senior TT and he was 7th in the junior TT in 1953.

References 

1923 births
2004 deaths
New Zealand motorcycle racers
350cc World Championship riders
500cc World Championship riders
Isle of Man TT riders